Ilich, Ilyich, or Ilitch is a common Russian patronymic meaning "son of Ilya". In some Hispanic countries it is also used as a given name, honoring Vladimir Lenin (Vladimir Ilyich Ulyanov). 
Ilich or Ilitch (Macedonian or Russian: Илич, Serbian: Илић) is also a separate non-Russian Slavic surname. 
The name may refer to the following people:
Given name
Pyotr Ilyich Tchaikovsky (born 1840), Russian composer
Ilich Lozano (born 1982), Mexican politician
Ilich Ramírez Sánchez or Carlos the Jackal (born 1949), Venezuelan terrorist 
Ilyich Rivas (born 1993), Venezuelan conductor

Surname
Christopher Ilitch (born 1965), American businessman, son of Marian and Mike
Denise Ilitch (born 1955), American businesswoman and lawyer, daughter of Marian and Mike
Fran Ilich, Mexican writer and media artist 
Ivan Illich, (1926–2002), Austrian writer
Janine Ilitch (born 1972), Australian netball player
Marian Ilitch (born 1933), American businesswoman, wife of Mike
Mike Ilitch (1929–2017), American entrepreneur
Mike and Marian Ilitch Humanitarian Award
Ilitch Holdings
Nikola Ilich (born 1992), American association football midfielder 
Olga Ilich (born 1950 or 1951), Canadian politician
Tode Ilich, Mayor of Kumanovo Municipality in Macedonia

See also
The Death of Ivan Ilyich, 1886 novella by Leo Tolstoy

Macedonian-language surnames